The 2018 African Weightlifting Championships took place in Mahébourg, Mauritius in August of that year.

These are the results.

56 kg Men

62 kg Men

69 kg Men

77 kg Men

85 kg Men

94 kg Men

105 kg Men

+105 kg Men

48 kg Women

53 kg Women

58 kg Women

63 kg Women

69 kg Women

75 kg Women

90 kg Women

+90 kg Women

References 

African Weightlifting Championships
2018 in weightlifting
International sports competitions hosted by Mauritius